Diapyra is a genus of moths in the family Sesiidae.

Species
Diapyra igniflua (Lucas, 1894)

References

Sesiidae
Moth genera
Taxa named by Alfred Jefferis Turner